The second inauguration of Dwight D. Eisenhower as president of the United States was held privately on Sunday, January 20, 1957, at the White House and publicly on the following day, Monday, January 21, 1957, at the East Portico of the United States Capitol; both located in Washington, D.C. This was the 43rd inauguration and marked the commencement of the second and final four-year term of both Dwight D. Eisenhower as president and Richard Nixon as vice president. Chief Justice Earl Warren administered the presidential oath of office after the Senate Minority Leader William Knowland swore in the vice president.

During the Oath, as at his first inaugural, Eisenhower said the line "the office of President of the United States" as "the office of the President of the United States," even as Chief Justice Warren said the line correctly.

See also
Presidency of Dwight D. Eisenhower
First inauguration of Dwight D. Eisenhower
1956 United States presidential election

References

External links

Video of Eisenhower's Second Inaugural Address from Hulu.com
 Text of Eisenhower's Second Inaugural Address
 Audio of Eisenhower's Second Inaugural Address

1957 in Washington, D.C.
1957 in American politics
Inauguration 1957
United States presidential inaugurations
January 1957 events in the United States